Amadeo Barletta Barletta was born in Italy in 1894 and died in the Dominican Republic in 1975. He was a successful Italian entrepreneur who migrated to the Caribbean in the early years of the 20th century and made significant contributions to the modernization of transportation and the media in the Dominican Republic and Cuba. 
Barletta's unusual business acumen and character allowed him to overcome major adversities. A hurricane destroyed his properties in the Dominican Republic in 1930. Trujillo confiscated them in 1935. Batista seized his businesses in 1941. Fidel Castro expropriated them in 1960.

Biography
Curiously for an immigrant who transformed the urban landscape of Havana and other Latin American cities with the massive introduction of General Motors vehicles,  the year of his birth coincided with the launching of Benz Velo the first standardized car by Karl Benz.

He was born in the small village of San Nicola Arcella in the poor region of Calabria, where he attended elementary school and earned his first income writing letters and documents for the villagers who appreciated his exceptionally good calligraphy. At the early age of 17 he migrated from Italy to Puerto Rico via New York during the summer of 1912. His records are registered in the historical archives of Ellis Island, the only port of entry to America at that time, where he declared to be 18 years old.

Amadeo moved to the Dominican Republic in 1920 and founded Santo Domingo Motors.  
In Dominican Republic he engaged in the tobacco business, breaking Trujillo's monopoly with a U.S.A. company.  In 1935 Trujillo charged Barletta with conspiring to assassinate him, incarcerating him.  Barletta was the Honorary Consul of Italy appointed by Benito Mussolini. Trujillo cancelled his consular credentials by a decree and confiscated his properties and his Tobacco Company.

Benito Mussolini made moves to get his consul out of jail, demanded reimbursement for all losses as a result of Barletta's imprisonment and a $200,000 indemnity. the USA State Department contacted Dominican Republic's Minister to the U. S., Rafael Brache, and Trujillo set a bail and Barletta was released from jail.

Barletta moved to Cuba in 1939 and became the first exclusive distributor of General Motors, outside the United States.

In 1942 Amadeo left Cuba and immigrated to Argentina looking for a neutral country during World War II.

In 1945 he returned to Cuba and developed his empire together with his son Amadeo Jr., by expanding and diversifying into the newspaper and television spheres.

From 1950 to 1959 his businesses grow and diversify.  He was the owner and editor of "El Mundo", one of the largest Cuban newspapers during the 1950s, and was also the exclusive representative for General Motors in Cuba, Venezuela and the Dominican Republic.

In 1960, Fidel Castro expropriated all his businesses and he was forced into exile with his family.

In 1962 right after Rafael Trujillo's assassination, he moves back to the Dominican Republic and he reorganize his old car business.  In 1964 he obtains distribution exclusivity for Nissan.

He died in the Dominican Republic (October 27, 1975).

Legacy
Amadeo Barletta Barletta married Nelia Ricart and had two children, Amadeo Barletta Jr., who was born in Santo Domingo, Dominican Republic in 1923, and Nelia Filomena Barletta Ricart, also born in Santo Domingo, Dominican Republic in 1932.

Amadeo Barletta Ricart married Laura Vicini and there are no descendants from this marriage. Amadeo Jr. died in 1975.

Nelia Filomena Barletta Ricart married Miguel Morales Abreu, the son of Miguel Morales y Calvo de la Puerta, marquess of Valle-Siciliana, and had two children: Miguel Morales Barletta and Nelia Morales Barletta.

References

External links
 The History of Motorambar in Spanish
 Infante, Fernando (2007) La Era de Trujillo. Cronología Histórica. 1930–1961 Tomo 1 
 Vega, Bernardo (2009) Desiderio Arias y Trujillo se escriben.   
 
  Lucky Luciano en el Malecón

1894 births
1975 deaths
People in the automobile industry
Italian emigrants to the Dominican Republic
20th-century Dominican Republic businesspeople
Dominican Republic people of Calabrian descent